Michael Hermanussen (born 26 April 1955 in Hamburg) is a German pediatrician and professor at the University of Kiel. He is known for his work on growth and nutrition.

Life
Hermanussen studied medicine and worked as a pediatrician at the University of Kiel from 1982 until 1989. He investigated growth and child development (auxology) and first described mini growth spurts. Since 1990 he cooperates in international joint projects with scientists and also works in a general pediatric office. He organizes national and international meetings on growth and nutrition. From 2003 to 2011 he was a member of the scientific board of the German society for Anthropology and chief editor of ”Anthropologischer Anzeiger”. He is the founder and head of the German society for auxology.

Scientific Work
Hermanussen developed new mathematical methods for improved diagnostics of growth disorders and a new technique for estimating final adult height.
He developed mini-knemometry, a new and accurate technique for growth measurements in children. This device determines the lower leg length at an accuracy that growth becomes measurable within a few days. In addition he developed a similar technology for measuring growth in rats within intervals of a few hours. This technology was important for the better understanding of the effects of growth hormone. His investigations resulted in a significant improvement of growth hormone therapies. For the first time, Hermanussen showed that anorexia nervosa patients do not only stop growing they even can shrink.

Since 2002 he works in nutrition and obesity, with particular respect to monosodium glutamate on appetite regulation. During this project Hermanussen showed for the first time that convenience food contains neurotransmitters.

External links
 homepage
PubMed citations
Hermanussen, Michael (2013) Auxology. Studying Human Growth and Development. Schweizerbart Science

Footnotes

German pediatricians
German anthropologists
German medical researchers
1955 births
Living people
Auxologists